Francisco (died 28 April 1876) was the last person to be executed in Brazil. An enslaved person, he was hanged for the murder of his masters.

In 1874, Francisco and two other slaves, Prudêncio and Vicente, were arrested for having beat to death their masters, João Evangelista de Lima and his wife Josepha Marta de Lima. The act was committed in Pilar, Alagoas. Francisco and Prudêncio fled to Pesqueira; in a confrontation with police, Prudêncio was killed and Francisco was captured. Vicente had fled to Marechal Deodoro, where he was captured.

At Francisco and Vicente's trial, they were both found guilty of the murders. Francisco was sentenced to death by hanging and Vicente was sentenced to life imprisonment. Both appealed to Emperor Dom Pedro II for clemency; Francisco's appeal was denied and the emperor did not respond to Vicente's. Vicente later died in prison.

Francisco's execution was carried out in Pilar on 28 April 1876. It was the last execution carried out by Brazil.

Since 2000, an annual re-enactment of Francisco's last hours has been held in Pilar on 28 April. In part, the re-enactment is intended to celebrate the abolition of the death penalty in Brazil.

References
 Félix Lima Júnior, Última Execução Judicial no Brasil (Maceió: Edufal, 1979).
Aliny Gama, "Encenação em Alagoas lembra os 135 anos da última execução por pena de morte no Brasil", uol.com.br, 28 April 2011.
"Pilar e a última execução judicial do Brasil", historiadealagoas.com.br, 2 June 2015.

1876 deaths
1876 in Brazil
19th-century executions
Brazilian people convicted of murder
Brazilian slaves
Executed Brazilian people
People convicted of murder by Brazil
People executed by Brazil by hanging
People executed for murder
People from Alagoas
1876 crimes in Brazil
1876 murders in South America
19th-century murders in Brazil